Steve Hérélius (born 15 July 1976) is a French former professional boxer who competed from 2002 to 2013 and held the WBA interim cruiserweight title from 2010 to 2011.

Professional career
Nicknamed Centurion, Herelius turned pro in 2002 and after winning his first fourteen fights fought veteran heavyweight Albert Sosnowski in 2007 and lost via TKO. After fighting mainly journeyman opposition he positioned himself to challenge Firat Arslan for the vacant WBA interim Cruiserweight belt. Arslan was coming into the bout after an extended absence, and was unable to continue after taking a hard uppercut from Herelius at the end of the 11th round. On 12 February 2011, Hérélius lost the WBA interim Cruiserweight belt to Yoan Pablo Hernández by knockout of the 7th round.

Professional boxing record

References

External links

Cruiserweight boxers
World cruiserweight boxing champions
World Boxing Association champions
1976 births
Living people
People from Noisy-le-Grand
French male boxers
Sportspeople from Seine-Saint-Denis